Luciferianism is a belief system that venerates the essential characteristics that are affixed to Lucifer, the name of various mythological and religious figures associated with the planet Venus. The tradition usually reveres Lucifer not as the devil, but as a destroyer, a guardian, liberator, light bringer or guiding spirit to darkness, or even the true god as opposed to Yahweh.

Lucifer as a literary and religious character 

The word Lucifer is taken from the Latin Vulgate, which translates הֵילֵל as lucifer, even though the Biblical Hebrew word הֵילֵל, which occurs only once in the Hebrew Bible, has been transliterated as hêlêl, or heylel. The Septuagint renders הֵילֵל in Greek as ἑωσφόρος (heōsphoros), a name, literally "bringer of dawn", for the morning star. Later Christian tradition came to use the Latin word for "morning star", lucifer, as a proper name ("Lucifer") for the Devil; as he was before his fall. As a result, Lucifer has become a by-word for Satan or the Devil in the church and in popular literature", as in Dante Alighieri's Inferno, Joost van den Vondel's Lucifer and John Milton's Paradise Lost. However, the Latin word never came to be used almost exclusively, as in English, in this way, and was applied to others also, including Jesus. The image of a morning star fallen from the sky is generally believed among scholars to have a parallel in Canaanite mythology.

According to both Christian and Jewish exegesis, in Chapter 14 of the Book of Isaiah, the King of Babylon (Nebuchadnezzar II), conqueror of Jerusalem, is condemned in a prophetic vision by the prophet Isaiah and is called the "Morning Star" (planet Venus). The Hebrew text in this chapter says, . Helel ben Shahar may refer to the Morning Star, but the text in Isaiah 14 gives no indication that Helel was a star or planet.

Common beliefs
Though associated with Satanism, a philosophy based on the Christian interpretation of the fallen angel, Luciferianism differs in that it does not revere merely the devil figure or Satan but the broader figure of Lucifer, an entity representing various interpretations of "the morning star" as understood by ancient cultures such as the Greeks and Egyptians. In this context, Lucifer is a symbol of enlightenment, independence, and human progression and is often used interchangeably with similar figures from ancient beliefs, such as the Greek titan Prometheus or the Jewish Talmudic figure Lilith.

For Luciferians, enlightenment is the ultimate goal. The basic Luciferian principles highlight truth and freedom of will, worshipping the inner self and one's ultimate potential, and to encourage and celebrate the same within all. Traditional dogma is shunned as a basis for morality on the grounds that humans should not need deities or fear of eternal punishment to distinguish right from wrong and to do good. All ideas should be tested before being accepted, and even then one should remain skeptical because knowledge and understanding are fluid. Regardless of whether Lucifer is conceived of as a deity or as a mere archetype, he is a representation of ultimate knowledge and exploration as well as humanity's savior and a champion for continuing personal growth.

Theistic Luciferians believe in Lucifer as an actual deity. However, Lucifer is not worshipped as the Abrahamic God, but is revered and followed as a teacher and friend. Most Theistic Luciferians are followers of the left-hand path and may adhere to different dogmata put forth by organizations such as the Neo-Luciferian Church or other congregations which are heavily focused on ceremonial magic, the occult, and literal interpretations of spiritual stories and figures. Many modern-day pagans also believe that Lucifer and many other demons were originally gods of ancient civilizations that were demonized by the Abrahamic religions.

History

Medieval
The Luciferian label—in the sense of Lucifer-worshipper—was first used in the Gesta Treverorum in 1231 for a religious circle led by a woman named Lucardis (Luckhardis). It was said that in private she lamented the fall of Lucifer (Satan) and yearned for his restoration to heavenly rule. The sect was exposed by the Papal Inquisition. In 1234, Pope Gregory IX issued the bull Vox in Rama calling for a crusade against the Stedinger, who were accused of Luciferianism. The bull contains a detailed description of supposed rites and beliefs. This description was repeated and occasionally expanded in the following centuries, but "modern historiography agrees on their entirely fictitious nature". The actual identity of the heretics accused of Luciferianism is often difficult to ascertain. Those of the 13th-century Rhineland appear to have been Cathars (Alexander Patschovsky) or a distinct off-shoot of the Cathars (Piotr Czarnecki).

In the 14th century, the term Luciferians was applied to what appear to have been Waldensians. They were persecuted under the Luciferian label in Schweidnitz in 1315 and in Angermünde in 1336. In 1392–1394, when some four hundred Luciferians from Brandenburg and Pomerania were brought before the inquisitor Peter Zwicker, he exonerated them of devil-worship and correctly identified them as Waldensians. At the same time, the inquisitor Antonio di Settimo in Piedmont believed the local Waldensians to be Luciferians.

Modern

Lucifer the Lightbearer was an individualist anarchist journal published in the United States by Moses Harman in the late 19th and early 20th centuries. It has been reported that "the title was selected, stated Harman, because it expressed the paper's mission. Lucifer, the name given to the morning star by the people of the ancient world, served as the symbol of the publication and represented the ushering in of a new day. He declared that freethinkers had sought to redeem and glorify the name Lucifer while theologians cursed him as the prince of the fallen angels. Harman suggested that Lucifer would take on the role of an educator. 'The God of the Bible doomed mankind to perpetual ignorance,' wrote Harman, 'and [people] would never have known Good from Evil if Lucifer had not told them how to become as wise as the gods themselves.

Lucifer was a publication edited by the influential occultist Helena Blavatsky. The journal was first published by Blavatsky. From 1889 until Blavatsky's death in May 1891, Annie Besant was a co-editor. Rudolf Steiner's writings, which formed the basis for anthroposophy, characterised Lucifer as a spiritual opposite to Ahriman, with Christ between the two forces, mediating a balanced path for humanity. Lucifer represents an intellectual, imaginative and otherworldly force which might be associated with visions, subjectivity, psychosis and fantasy. He associated Lucifer with the religious and philosophical cultures of Egypt, Rome, and Greece. Steiner believed that Lucifer, as a supersensible Being, had incarnated in China about 3000 years before the birth of Christ.

Léo Taxil (1854–1907) claimed that Freemasonry is associated with worshipping Lucifer. In what is known as the Taxil hoax, he alleged that leading Freemason Albert Pike had addressed "[t]he 23 Supreme Confederated Councils of the world" (an invention of Taxil), instructing them that Lucifer was God, and was in opposition to the evil god Adonai. Supporters of Freemasonry contend that, when Albert Pike and other Masonic scholars spoke about the "Luciferian path" or the "energies of Lucifer", they were referring to the Morning Star, the light bearer, the search for light; the very antithesis of dark, Satanic evil. Taxil promoted a book by Diana Vaughan (actually written by himself, as he later confessed publicly) that purported to reveal a highly secret ruling body called the Palladium, which controlled the organization and had a Satanic agenda. As described by Freemasonry Disclosed in 1897:

Taxil's work and Pike's address continue to be quoted by anti-Masonic groups.

In Devil-Worship in France, Arthur Edward Waite compared Taxil's work to what today would be called a tabloid story, replete with logical and factual inconsistencies.

Madeline Montalban was an English astrologer and witch. She co-founded the esoteric organisation known as the Order of the Morning Star (OMS), through which she propagated her own form of Luciferianism. In 1952, she met Nicholas Heron, with whom she entered into a relationship. An engraver, photographer, and former journalist for the Brighton Argus, he shared her interest in the occult and together they developed a magical system based upon Luciferianism, the veneration of the deity Lucifer, or Lumiel, whom they considered to be a benevolent angelic deity. In 1956, they founded the Order of the Morning Star, or Ordo Stella Matutina (OSM), propagating it through a correspondence course. The couple sent out lessons to those who paid the necessary fees over a series of weeks, eventually leading to the twelfth lesson, which contained The Book of Lumiel, a short work written by Montalban that documented her understanding of Lumiel, or Lucifer, and his involvement with humankind. The couple initially lived together in Torrington Place, London, from where they ran the course; but in 1961 moved to the coastal town of Southsea in Hampshire, where there was greater room for Heron's engraving equipment.

In Rules for Radicals (his final work, published in 1971 one year before his death), the prominent American community organizer and writer Saul Alinsky wrote at the end of his personal acknowledgements:

In Anton LaVey's The Satanic Bible, Lucifer is one of the four crown princes of hell, particularly that of the East, the "lord of the air", and is described as the bringer of light, the morning star, intellectualism, and enlightenment. The title "lord of the air" is based upon Ephesians 2:2, which uses the phrase "prince of the power of the air'" to refer to Satan.

Author Michael W. Ford has written on Lucifer as a "mask" of the adversary, a motivator and illuminating force of the mind and subconscious.

Organizations

Fraternitas Saturni 
Stephen Flowers, in his book on the German magical order Fraternitas Saturni, (FS) says that "the FS is (or was) the most unabashedly Luciferian organization in the modern Western occult revival". Hans Thomas Hakl describes the theological doctrine of the Fraternitas Saturni in the following manner:
A Logos was necessary in order for the light to dawn; and this Logos was Lucifer, the Light-Bringer. Lucifer is the demiurge, who created our visible world by breaking the static cosmic order. The result was War in Heaven, by which death entered the world. Lucifer is regarded as the "higher octave" of Saturn (Satan representing its "lower octave"), the outermost planet and polar opposite of the Sun in ancient cosmology. Because of this ongoing opposition Lucifer is still fighting the Solar Logos. The principal battlefield is our earth, which contains a negative-astral and a positive-mental sphere apart from its physical form. Saturn is seen as the great judge with scales and sword, entrusted with weight, measure and number. He is the Guardian of the Threshold, or the gateway to transcendence. Because he betrayed divine mysteries to mankind, he has been punished. His heavy, dark, leaden qualities must be transformed into silver by the magician, in an alchemical process involving the "repolarisation of lights".

Greater Church of Lucifer
In 2014, Luciferians founded a worldwide organization for Luciferians from Houston, Texas, known as the Greater Church of Lucifer (GCoL) under the leadership of church founder Jacob Mckelvy, co-presidents Michael W. Ford and Jeremy Crow, founder of the Luciferian Research Society.  McKelvy later converted to Protestantism. In January 2015, the founders of GCoL filed paperwork in the Austin County Courthouse in order to do business under the GCoL name. The GCoL focuses more on teachings based on the practical world. Family and personal progression are among its key tenets.

In 2015, the GCoL opened a house of worship in Old Town Spring, Texas, with several dozen members. Over a hundred local residents, mainly Catholic, protested the opening of the church.

The Luciferian philosophy of the Greater Church of Lucifer is defined by a foundation called the "11 Luciferian Points of Power", authored by Michael W. Ford. The text of the 11 points shows that Michael Ford, and by extension, the Greater Church of Lucifer which he leads, equate Lucifer with Satan. The 11-points philosophy cultivates and encourages individuality, self-determined choices based upon strategic application, and continually seeking to enhance one's will via overcoming challenges. Furthermore, it is practiced with the continual cycle and process known as "liberation, illumination, and apotheosis". The term "apotheosis" means "making oneself a god".

Neo-Luciferian Church
The Neo-Luciferian Church (NLC) is a Gnostic and Luciferian organisation with roots in Western esotericism, Voodoo, Luciferianism, Thelema, and magic.

See also
LaVeyan Satanism
Lucifer and Prometheus

References

Further reading

External links

 
Left-Hand Path